The Men's Under-23 Individual Time Trial at the 1998 UCI Road World Championships was held on October 6, 1998, from Maastricht to Vilt, Netherlands, over a total distance of 32.9 kilometres. There were a total number of 65 entries, with two non-starters: Gordon Bearman (New Zealand) and Dmitri Parfimovich (Russia).

Final classification

References
Results

Men's Under-23 Time Trial
UCI Road World Championships – Men's under-23 time trial